Justpaste.it is a site that allows users to paste text (including HTML markup for formatting and display of images) and distribute the resulting link. The site became the object of international attention after supporters of the Islamic State (abbreviated IS, ISIS, or ISIL) began to use the site to disseminate information.

Features 
The simple design of the site has several features like:
 Users simply paste material and receive a link to share it without registration.
 It loads quickly on mobile devices with poor Internet connections.
 It works with right-to-left languages, such as the Arabic language.
 It supports photo and video content.
 It is easy to use; according to its creator, "You are able to do what you want with almost two clicks."

As of August 2014, the site lacked a search feature and did not run ads, nor ran displayed ads.  As a free service that can be accessed by phones, from proxy IP addresses or via TOR routers, it was not able to prevent users from returning to post messages except by blocking IPs.

Use by the Islamic State 

Notable messages attributed to IS that have been pasted to JustPaste.it include a threat to Twitter employees who repeatedly shut down IS-linked accounts, a list of names and addresses of American armed forces personnel, and photos posted by an IS sympathizer that were used by bloggers at Bellingcat to identify the location of an IS training camp on the Euphrates river. Posting to JustPaste.it and Archive.org has been described as a response to Twitter's censorship of accounts, though "these anonymous posts eventually end up on Twitter", which suspended 20,000 accounts suspected of IS association in February 2015, but has been advised by the Brookings Project on U.S. Relations with the Islamic World to work out a "proactive strategy for finding terrorists" with the U.S. government.

Administration 
The site is owned and managed by Mariusz Żurawek, a 26-year-old Polish entrepreneur from Wroclaw, who holds a master's degree in informatics and econometrics.  Maintaining the site singlehandedly, he described his efforts to comply with international Internet censorship efforts.  "It’s not my choice that ISIS [the Islamic State] has selected my site ... As long as I’m cooperating with the police, removing content, not allowing ISIS to make propaganda, I think it’s good for the site that many people will know about it."  According to Zurawek, "I’ve got a constant cooperation with the UK police, and if they found any illegal materials, they just send a take-down notice."  Materials for which the police request deletion include "videos attempting to persuade western Muslims to join Isis, graphic executions committed by Isis fighters and other material which incites violence and glorifies the actions of this group".

References 

Polish websites
Islamic State of Iraq and the Levant